Luis Barbosa (born January 21, 1953) is a Colombian male long distance athlete. He was the only silver medalist for his country, in the 1979 Pan American Games (San Juan, Puerto Rico) in the men's marathon, and finished 34th, in the same event, in the 1980 Olympic Games (Moscow).

Achievements

References
sports-reference

1953 births
Living people
Colombian male long-distance runners
Athletes (track and field) at the 1979 Pan American Games
Athletes (track and field) at the 1980 Summer Olympics
Olympic athletes of Colombia
Pan American Games silver medalists for Colombia
Pan American Games medalists in athletics (track and field)
Medalists at the 1979 Pan American Games
20th-century Colombian people